Aleksei Alekseyevich Kalashnik (born 20 January 1983) is a former Russian professional football player.

Club career
He played two seasons in the Russian Football National League for FC Kristall Smolensk and FC Volgar-Gazprom Astrakhan.

External links
 
 

1983 births
Russian people of Ukrainian descent
Living people
Russian footballers
Association football midfielders
FC Volgar Astrakhan players
FC Sokol Saratov players
FC Kristall Smolensk players
FC Rostov players
FC Avangard Kursk players
FC Neftekhimik Nizhnekamsk players
FC Dynamo Bryansk players